Out of Our Idiot is a 1987 compilation album of rare and previously unreleased recordings dating back to 1979 by Elvis Costello, which was released in the UK on Demon Records (FIEND 67). It was only available as an import in the USA and other markets. The album was credited to "Various Artists" rather than to Costello because the tracks were recorded and credited under a variety of names, including The Costello Show, Elvis Costello and the Attractions, Elvis Costello and the Confederates, The Coward Brothers, Napoleon Dynamite, The Emotional Toothpaste and The MacManus Gang. The songs featured a variety of collaborators, including Jimmy Cliff, Nick Lowe and T-Bone Burnett.

Content 
The album consisted of previously released tracks and alternate versions of released tracks. The one song that had never been released in any form prior to Out of Our Idiot was Costello with the Attractions' cover of "So Young". "Little Goody Two Shoes" was an early version of "Inch by Inch".

Track listing 
All songs written by Elvis Costello except as indicated.

CD version
 "Seven Day Weekend" (Costello, Jimmy Cliff) – 2:37
 "Turning The Town Red" – 3:20
 "Heathen Town" – 3:06
 "The People's Limousine" (Costello, T-Bone Burnett) – 3:38
 "So Young" (Joe Camilleri, Tony Faehse, Jeff Burstin) – 3:27
 "Little Goody Two Shoes" – 2:27
 "American Without Tears No. 2" – (Declan MacManus) 3:34
 "Get Yourself Another Fool" (Frank Haywood, Ernest Tucker) – 4:02
 "Walking on Thin Ice" (Yoko Ono) – 3:42
 "Withered And Died" (Richard Thompson) – 3:13
 "Blue Chair" (single version) (Declan MacManus) – 3:39
 "Baby It's You" (Burt Bacharach, Mack David, Barney Williams) – 3:15
 "From Head To Toe" (Smokey Robinson) – 2:34
 "Shoes Without Heels" (Declan MacManus) – 4:15
 "Baby's Got A Brand New Hairdo" (Declan MacManus) – 3:21
 "The Flirting Kind" – 2:58
 "Black Sails in the Sunset" – 3:09
 "A Town Called Big Nothing" – 5:44
 "Big Sister" – 2:16
 "Imperial Bedroom" (demo version) – 2:47
 "The Stamping Ground" (demo version) – 3:10

LP version

Side one
 "Seven Day Weekend" 
 "Turning the Town Red"
 "Heathen Town"
 "The People's Limousine" 
 "So Young"
 "American Without Tears No. 2" 
 "Get Yourself Another Fool" 
 "Walking on Thin Ice"

Side two
 "Blue Chair" 
 "Baby It's You" 
 "From Head to Toe" 
 "Shoes Without Heels" 
 "Baby's Got a Brand New Hairdo" 
 "The Flirting Kind"
 "Black Sails in the Sunset"
 "Imperial Bedroom"
 "The Stamping Ground"

Release 
Two versions of Out of Our Idiot were released, a 17-track vinyl LP, and a 21-track CD. Tracks 6, 10, 18, and 19 on the CD were not included on the vinyl release. With the exception of "Little Goody Two Shoes", all of the tracks on Out of Our Idiot were later released as bonus tracks on individual albums when Costello's pre-1987 catalogue was re-released on CD on the Rykodisc and Rhino labels.  An alternate version of "Little Goody Two Shoes" was included on the Imperial Bedroom bonus disc.

Personnel

Elvis Costello (solo)

("American Without Tears No. 2 (Twilight Version)", "Blue Chair", "Baby It's You")
Elvis Costello – guitar, vocals
Nick Lowe – bass, vocals (on "Baby It's You")
T-Bone Burnett – rhythm guitar (on "Blue Chair")
Tom "T-Bone" Wolk – bass (on "Blue Chair")
Steve Nieve – keyboards (on "Blue Chair")
Mickey Curry – drums (on "Blue Chair")

The Coward Brothers

("The People's Limousine")
Elvis Costello – lead guitar, vocals (as "Howard Coward")
T-Bone Burnett – rhythm guitar, vocals (as "Henry Coward")
David Miner – bass
Ron Tutt – drums

Elvis Costello and the Attractions

 ("Seven Day Weekend", "Turning the Town Red", "Heathen Town", "So Young", "Get Yourself Another Fool", "Walking on Thin Ice", "From Head to Toe", "The Flirting Kind", "Black Sails in the Sunset")
Elvis Costello – guitar, vocals
Steve Nieve – keyboards
Bruce Thomas – bass
Pete Thomas – drums
Jimmy Cliff – vocals (on "Seven Day Weekend")
TKO Horns – horns (on "Walking on Thin Ice")

Elvis Costello and the Confederates

("Shoes Without Heels")
Elvis Costello – guitar, vocals
James Burton – guitar
Jerry Scheff – bass
Ron Tutt – drums

The Costello Show, featuring the Attractions

("Baby's Got a Brand New Hairdo")

Napoleon Dynamite and the Royal Guard

("Imperial Bedroom")
Elvis Costello – guitar, vocals
Gary Barnacle – tenor & baritone saxophone
Annie Whitehead – trombone

The Emotional Toothpaste

("The Stamping Ground")
Elvis Costello – guitar, vocals

References

Albums produced by Nick Lowe
Albums produced by Elvis Costello
Albums produced by Clive Langer
Albums produced by Alan Winstanley
Albums produced by T Bone Burnett
Elvis Costello compilation albums
1987 compilation albums